This is the list of the 75 isomers of decane.

Straight-chain
Decane

Nonane
2-Methylnonane
3-Methylnonane
4-Methylnonane
5-Methylnonane

Octane

Ethyl
3-Ethyloctane
4-Ethyloctane

Dimethyl

2,2-Dimethyloctane
2,3-Dimethyloctane
2,4-Dimethyloctane
2,5-Dimethyloctane
2,6-Dimethyloctane
2,7-Dimethyloctane
3,3-Dimethyloctane
3,4-Dimethyloctane
3,5-Dimethyloctane
3,6-Dimethyloctane
4,4-Dimethyloctane
4,5-Dimethyloctane

Heptane

Propyl
4-n-Propylheptane   or   4-Propylheptane
4-(1-Methylethyl)heptane or 4-Isopropylheptane

Ethyl+Methyl

3-Ethyl-2-methylheptane
3-Ethyl-3-methylheptane
3-Ethyl-4-methylheptane
3-Ethyl-5-methylheptane
4-Ethyl-2-methylheptane
4-Ethyl-3-methylheptane
4-Ethyl-4-methylheptane
5-Ethyl-2-methylheptane

Trimethyl

2,2,3-Trimethylheptane
2,2,4-Trimethylheptane
2,2,5-Trimethylheptane
2,2,6-Trimethylheptane
2,3,3-Trimethylheptane
2,3,4-Trimethylheptane
2,3,5-Trimethylheptane
2,3,6-Trimethylheptane
2,4,4-Trimethylheptane
2,4,5-Trimethylheptane
2,4,6-Trimethylheptane
2,5,5-Trimethylheptane
3,3,4-Trimethylheptane
3,3,5-Trimethylheptane
3,4,4-Trimethylheptane
3,4,5-Trimethylheptane

Hexane

Methyl+Propyl
2-Methyl-3-(1-methylethyl)hexane or 3-isopropyl-2-methylhexane

Diethyl
3,3-Diethylhexane
3,4-Diethylhexane

Ethyl+Dimethyl

3-Ethyl-2,2-dimethylhexane
3-Ethyl-2,3-dimethylhexane
3-Ethyl-2,4-dimethylhexane
3-Ethyl-2,5-dimethylhexane
3-Ethyl-3,4-dimethylhexane
4-Ethyl-2,2-dimethylhexane
4-Ethyl-2,3-dimethylhexane
4-Ethyl-2,4-dimethylhexane
4-Ethyl-3,3-dimethylhexane

Tetramethyl

2,2,3,3-Tetramethylhexane
2,2,3,4-Tetramethylhexane
2,2,3,5-Tetramethylhexane
2,2,4,4-Tetramethylhexane
2,2,4,5-Tetramethylhexane
2,2,5,5-Tetramethylhexane
2,3,3,4-Tetramethylhexane
2,3,3,5-Tetramethylhexane
2,3,4,4-Tetramethylhexane
2,3,4,5-Tetramethylhexane
3,3,4,4-Tetramethylhexane

Pentane

Dimethyl+Propyl
2,4-Dimethyl-3-(1-methylethyl)pentane or 3-Isopropyl-2,4-dimethylpentane

Diethyl+Methyl
3,3-Diethyl-2-methylpentane

Ethyl+Trimethyl
3-Ethyl-2,2,3-trimethylpentane
3-Ethyl-2,2,4-trimethylpentane
3-Ethyl-2,3,4-trimethylpentane

Pentamethyl
2,2,3,3,4-Pentamethylpentane
2,2,3,4,4-Pentamethylpentane

References 

Hydrocarbons
Isomerism
Lists of isomers of alkanes